André Haguet (1900–1973) was a French screenwriter.

Selected filmography
 The Weaker Sex (1933)
 The Faceless Voice (1933)
 Mandrin (1947)
 Dark Sunday (1948)
 The Passenger (1949)
 At the Order of the Czar (1954)
 Hungarian Rhapsody (1954)

1900 births
1973 deaths
French film directors
French film producers
French male screenwriters
20th-century French screenwriters
20th-century French male writers